New Justice was a 2018 relaunch by American comic book publisher DC Comics of its entire line of ongoing monthly superhero comic book titles, using the end of Dark Nights: Metal as its launching point, followed by the events Year of the Villain and Dark Nights: Death Metal.

List of titles

Ongoing series

Limited series

One-shots

"Batman"

"Year of the Villain"

"Superman"

"Tales from the Dark Multiverse"

"The Infected"

See also 
The New Age of DC Heroes
The Sandman Universe

References

External links 
 Official DC Comics website

2018 comics debuts
2018 in comics
Comic book reboots
DC Comics storylines
DC Comics titles
Superhero comics